Jalan Serian–Tebedu, Federal Route 21, is a major highway in Serian Division, Sarawak, Malaysia. It is a dual lane road that is maintained by PPES Works Sdn. Bhd., a subsidiary of CMS Road. It connects Serian roundabout to Tebedu. Among other major destinations branched out from this route are Riih, Tebakang and Mongkos. It is a major route to West Kalimantan, Indonesia and is frequently used by people from both Malaysia and Indonesia to cross the border. Along this road are many scattered houses, privately owned orchards, churches, primary schools and chapels. It branches out to many small villages such as Kg. Kakai and Kg. Tian. GIATMARA institution of Serian district is also located here.

The Kilometre Zero is located at Tebedu town.

List of interchanges

References

Malaysian Federal Roads
Highways in Malaysia
Serian Division